Sylvanus "Quicksilver" Okpala (born 5 September 1961) is a retired Nigerian football midfielder.

Okpala played club football for Enugu Rangers, C.S. Marítimo and C.D. Nacional in the Portuguese Liga.

Okpala played for the Nigeria national football team at the 1980 and 1988 Summer Olympics. He also played for the squad that won the 1980 African Cup of Nations.

On 8 November 2011, Sylvanus has become assistant manager of Nigeria National Team.
.

References

1961 births
Living people
Sportspeople from Anambra State
Nigerian footballers
Association football midfielders
Rangers International F.C. players
C.F. União players
C.S. Marítimo players
C.D. Nacional players
Primeira Liga players
Olympic footballers of Nigeria
Nigeria international footballers
1980 African Cup of Nations players
Footballers at the 1980 Summer Olympics
1982 African Cup of Nations players
Footballers at the 1988 Summer Olympics
Africa Cup of Nations-winning players
Nigerian expatriate footballers
Nigerian expatriate sportspeople in Portugal
Expatriate footballers in Portugal